Cirque may refer to:

 Cirque, an amphitheatre-like valley head
 Cirque (album), a 2000 album by Biosphere
 Cirque Corporation, a Salt Lake City, Utah-based company which developed and commercialized the first successful capacitive touchpad
 Cirque du Soleil, a Canadian entertainment company
 Contemporary circus, a genre of performing art developed in the later 20th century
 , 1891 painting by Georges Seurat

See also 
 Sirk'i (disambiguation)